Juabo is a village in the Western Region of Ghana.

References

Populated places in the Western Region (Ghana)
Villages in Ghana